Kyle Rees (born 9 July 1988, Port Talbot, Wales) is a Welsh actor, best known for playing the role of Carl in the BAFTA-award winning movie, Pride.

Rees had a love for theatre from a young age. After attending Sandfields Comprehensive school, he studied at The Royal Scottish Academy of Music and Drama, from which he graduated in 2010.

He first found television fame on Hollyoaks where he landed the recurring role of Blue, a character which allowed him to explore the darker side of human nature. Further television success awaited on the hit soap Emmerdale, but it was his role in the 2014 critically acclaimed film Pride that gave him international fame.   His character, Carl, is pivotal to turning the entire mind frame of a small Welsh town, and in doing so opens doors for two very different communities to come together.

In 2015 he played the role of Calo Caine in FX Network's medieval drama series The Bastard Executioner, written by Kurt Sutter.
He also had a role in Outlander playing the character John Quincy Myers

References

Bibliography

External links
 

1988 births
Welsh male actors
People from Port Talbot
Living people